Luu Huy Chao (1936-; Vietnamese: Lưu Huy Chao) is a former pilot of the Vietnam People's Air Force and a Vietnam War flying ace. From 1966 until 1968, Lưu Huy Chao flew a Mikoyan-Gurevich MiG-17 "Fresco"  with the 923rd Fighter Regiment against the United States Air Force, during which time he was credited with six air victories. Luu Huy Chao was one of three pilots who flew MiG 17 aircraft to be confirmed by the US as aces. The pilots were Luu Huy Chao, Le Hai and Nguyễn Văn Bảy.

Early life 
Luu Huy Chao was born in Thanh Hoa province in Vietnam in 1936. He was accepted into the VPAF in 1957, and was sent to the People's Republic of China in 1959 for six years of training. After his return to North Vietnam in 1965, Chao flew a MiG-17 against the USAF. In February 1966, he shot down a C-47 carrying South Vietnamese infiltrators.

References 

1936 births
North Vietnamese Vietnam War flying aces
Living people
People from Thanh Hóa province